SPSO may refer to:

Scottish Public Services Ombudsman, an ombudsman responsible for looking at complaints made about public services
SportSouth, a regional sports network in the Southern United States
 Airport code for Capitán FAP Renán Elías Olivera Airport in Peru